Richard Edward Wormser (February 2, 1908 in New York City, New York – July,  in Tumacaciori, Arizona) was an American writer of pulp fiction, detective fiction, screenplays, and Westerns, some of it written using the pseudonym of Ed Friend. He is estimated to have written 300 short stories, 200 novelettes, 12 books, many screenplays and stories turned into screenplays, and a cookbook: Southwest Cookery or At Home on the Range.

Literary accomplishments
After graduating from Princeton University he became a prolific writer of pulp fiction under his own name, the pen name of Conrad Gerson, and wrote seventeen Nick Carter novels for Street & Smith.

Wormser's first crime fiction novel was The Man with the Wax Face in 1934. His first Western novel was The Lonesome Quarter in 1951.

Hollywood purchased several of his stories beginning with his It's All in the Racket filmed as Sworn Enemy in 1936. Columbia Pictures signed him for a short term writing contract in 1937. He was fired, then rehired by Columbia and worked for several other studios. Columbia once could not make up its mind between buying two of his stories, The Frame Up or Right Guy. The studio at last decided on Right Guy but filmed it under the title of The Frame-Up.

During World War II he served as a forest ranger.

Wormser won Western Spur Awards for juvenile fiction for Ride a Northbound Horse in 1964, and for The Black Mustanger in 1971. He also won an Edgar award for best original paperback novel for The Invader in 1973.

Novels
 The Man With the Wax Face, 1934
 The Communist’s Corpse, 1935
 All's Fair, 1937
 The Hanging Heiress, 1949
 The Lonesome Quarter, 1952 (western)
 The Longhorn Trail, 1955 (western)
 The Body Looks Familiar, 1958
 Slattery's Range, 1959 (western)
 The Late Mrs Five, 1960
 Drive East On 66, 1961
 Battalion of Saints, 1961 (western)
 Perfect Pigeon, 1962
 Three-Cornered War, 1962 (western)
 A Nice Girl Like You, 1963
 Pan Satyrus, 1963
 Ride a Northbound Horse, 1964 (western)
 The Green Hornet: The Infernal Light, 1966 (as Ed Friend)
 The Most Deadly Game #1: The Corpse in the Castle, 1970 (as Ed Friend)
 The Ranch by the Sea, 1970
 Black Mustanger, 1971 (western)
 The Takeover, 1971
 The Invader, 1972

Movie and TV tie-ins
Wormser authored a number of screenplay novelizations:
Thief of Baghdad, 1961
The Last Days of Sodom and Gomorrah, 1962
McLintock!, 1963
Bedtime Story, 1964
Operation Crossbow, 1965
Major Dundee, 1965
Alvarez Kelly, 1966
Torn Curtain, 1966
The Scalphunters, 1968
and four novels based on TV series,
three as "Ed Friend":
The Green Hornet: The Infernal Light, 1967, adaptation (Dell)
The High Chaparral: Coyote Gold, 1969, original (Tempo)
The Most Deadly Game: The Corpse in the Castle, 1970, original (Lancer)
and one as Richard Wormser:
The Wild Wild West, 1966, adaptation (Signet)

Notes

References
 Wormser, Richard, & Ira Skutch, How to Become a Complete Non-Entity: A Memoir, iUniverse, 2006

External links

Magazine stories http://www.philsp.com/homeville/FMI/s2396.htm#A92195

1908 births
1977 deaths
20th-century American novelists
Pulp fiction writers
American male screenwriters
American male novelists
20th-century American memoirists
Western (genre) writers
American male short story writers
20th-century American short story writers
20th-century American male writers
American male non-fiction writers
20th-century American screenwriters